Maurice Petherick (5 October 1894 – 4 August 1985)  was a British Conservative Party politician who served as the Member of Parliament (MP) for Penryn & Falmouth from 1931 to 1945, and as Financial Secretary to the War Office, briefly, in 1945.

Early life
He was born on 5 October 1894, the son of George Tallack Petherick (b. 1860) and Edith Petherick, his wife. He was educated at Marlborough College and Trinity College, Cambridge.

Military service
During the Great War, he was a Second Lieutenant in the Royal Devon Yeomanry 1914 but was invalided out in 1915. He served in Foreign Office, 1916–17; he was recommissioned Royal Scots Greys, 1917 and served in France, 1918. In October 1939, he was recommissioned to the General List Army, as a Captain and promoted to Temporary Major.

Parliamentary service
Having contested the parliamentary seat of Penryn & Falmouth in 1929, as a Conservative, he was elected as MP in that division in the General Elections of 1931 and 1935

He was one of the MPs, who, in 1945, opposed the Yalta agreement, because of the treatment of Poland. He was Financial Secretary to the War Office from 26 May 1945 to 4 August 1945, in the "Caretaker Government".

In the 1945 General Election, he was defeated by the Labour candidate, Evelyn King.

Other activities
Between 1953 and 1971, he was a Director of the Prudential Assurance Co. Ltd. He was High Sheriff of Cornwall in 1957. He wrote two novels and a collective biography of "rogues".

He died on 4 August 1985. At his death, his residence was Porthpean House, Lower Porthpean, St Austell, Cornwall. The garden that he developed there is still famous.

Publications
1932: Captain Culverin. London: Ernest Benn (novel)
1943: Victoire: a novel. London: Macmillan
1951: Restoration Rogues; with plates, including portraits. London: Hollis & Carter (On Thomas Blood, William Bedloe, Ralph Montagu, Thomas Dangerfield, Edward Fitzharris and Barbara Villiers.)

References

External links 

 

1894 births
1985 deaths
English gardeners
People educated at Marlborough College
Alumni of Trinity College, Cambridge
Politicians from Cornwall
Royal Scots Greys officers
British Army personnel of World War I
British Army personnel of World War II
People from St Austell
Conservative Party (UK) MPs for English constituencies
UK MPs 1931–1935
UK MPs 1935–1945
Members of the Parliament of the United Kingdom for Penryn and Falmouth
High Sheriffs of Cornwall
War Office personnel in World War II
Ministers in the Churchill caretaker government, 1945